The European grid is a proposed, multipurpose Pan-European mapping standard.  It is based on the ETRS89 Lambert Azimuthal Equal-Area projection coordinate reference system, with the centre of the projection at the point 52° N, 10° E and false easting: x0 = 4321000 m, false northing: y0 = 3210000 m (CRS identifier in Inspire: ETRS89-LAEA).

The grid is designated as Grid_ETRS89-LAEA5210. For identification of an individual resolution level, the name is extended by identification of cell size in metres (example: _100K).

The origin of Grid_ETRS89-LAEA5210 coincides with the false origin of the ETRS89-LAEA coordinate reference system (x=0, y=0). Grid points of grids based on ETRS89-LAEA must coincide with grid points at Grid_ETRS89-LAEA5210.

The grid is defined as hierarchical one in metric coordinates in power of 10.
The resolution of the grid is 1m, 10m, 100m, 1000m, 10,000m, 100,000m.
The grid orientation is south-north, west-east.
The reference point of the grid cell for grids based on ETRS89-LAEA is the lower left corner of the grid cell.

Norms 

 Official requirements, directives  2007/2/EC of the European Parliament: https://eur-lex.europa.eu/LexUriServ/LexUriServ.do?uri=OJ:L:2010:323:0011:0102:EN:PDF

 Current implementation of requirements, as INSPIRE standard:  https://inspire.ec.europa.eu/documents/Data_Specifications/INSPIRE_DataSpecification_GG_v3.1.pdf

See also 

ETRS89
Lambert Azimuthal Equal-Area projection

References
 Source: INSPIRE Reference Systems Thematic Working Group
 INSPIRE Specifications: Geographical grid systems

Standards
Cartography
Maps of Europe